The 2019 Monmouth Hawks football team represented Monmouth University in the 2019 NCAA Division I FCS football season as a member of the Big South Conference. They were led by 27th-year head coach Kevin Callahan and played their home games at Kessler Field in West Long Branch, New Jersey. Monmouth finished the season 11–3 overall and 6–0 in Big South play to win the conference title. The Hawks received the Big South's automatic bid to the FCS Playoffs. They defeated Holy Cross in the first round before losing to James Madison in the second round.

Previous season
The Hawks finished the 2018 season 8–3, 4–1 in Big South play to finish in second place in the Big South.

Preseason

Big South poll
In the Big South preseason poll released on July 21, 2019, the Hawks were predicted to finish in second place.

Preseason All–Big South team
The Hawks had five players selected to the preseason all-Big South team.

Offense

Kenji Bahar – QB

Juwon Farri – RB

Pete Guerriero – RB

Defense

Tymere Berry – DB

Special teams

Matt Mosquera – K

Schedule

Game summaries

at Western Michigan

Lafayette

Albany

at Montana

at Wagner

Presbyterian

Gardner–Webb

at Charleston Southern

at Kennesaw State

North Alabama

at Campbell

Hampton

FCS Playoffs
The Hawks received an automatic bid (due to winning their conference) for the postseason tournament, with a first-round pairing against Holy Cross.

Holy Cross–First Round

at James Madison–Second Round

Ranking movements

References

Monmouth
Monmouth Hawks football seasons
Big South Conference football champion seasons
Monmouth
Monmouth Hawks football